Casa del Rey Hotel (House of the King) was a resort hotel in Santa Cruz, California. During World War II the hotel was converted to the Naval Convalescent Hospital, Santa Cruz. The hotel was built in 1911 by Fred Swanton on Beach Street as a Santa Cruz Boardwalk development plan. The Resort Hotel had: a pool; gardens; and a grand pedestrian bridge to cross the street to visit the beach.  The hotel was at about 500 Beach Street and Cliff Street. In addition to the hotel, there were built Cottage apartments. Later after the war the hotel became a senior citizen housing. In the 1989 Loma Prieta earthquake there was serious damage to the hotel and was taken down. The site now is the parking lot across the street from the Santa Cruz Beach Boardwalk amusement park.

History

Casino
The Santa Cruz Railroad opened in 1874, but Santa Cruz did not become a resort destination. The Santa Cruz Railroad became part of the Southern Pacific Railroad in 1881. Santa Cruz became a resort in 1887, when the railroad shorted the line to Santa Cruz. Fred W. Swanton first built a casino, Neptune's Casino, and a beach tent city in 1904. The Casino offered 500 beach dressing rooms, a theater, a cafe, seaside grill, ballroom and roof gardens. The  Casino was designed by architect Edward L. Van Cleeck The Casino was a bar with entertainment and gambling was never legal there. But it was widely known visitors could find boats at the pleasure pier, now called the Santa Cruz Wharf, to take them out in ships into the harbor to gamble in the 1910 and 1920s. Swanton built an amusement park near the pier, some calling it the Coney Island of the West. In 1911 Charles I. D. Looff family built a Merry-go-round carousel and in 1924 the Giant Dipper roller coaster.. Both the Santa Cruz Looff Carousel and Roller Coaster are National Historic Landmarks.  The Casino changed its name to Cocoanut Grove from 1920 to 1933 during prohibition. On June 22, 1906, a fire started in the kitchen, destroyed the complete casino. Swanton hired William Henry Weeks and a new Casino was built and the Plunge Natatorium pools. At the same time, a new Cottage City was built for guests. The new Casino, Plunge and Cottage brought many new guests to the Santa Cruz Beach Boardwalk by the end of 1907. The Cottage City, was designed as a residential hotel for long summer stays. But, there was a great need for a regular hotel.  The hotel was served by a Horsecars offered tram service that started in 1876. The Santa Cruz, Garfield Park, and Capitola Electric Railroad service in 1881. The Union Traction Company consolidated the three electric tram service routes in 1904. One service line ran from DeLaveaga Park along Water Street and Pacific Avenue to the beach. Another from Ocean Cliffs to the hotel along what would become CA Route 1. The third line through Seabright to Capitola was completed in 1906. With more and more automobiles in use, the streetcar service ended in 1926. The Southern Pacific Railroad ran a summer excursion train, called Suntan Special, between San Francisco and the hotel from 1927 to 1959. The ballroom in the Casino has hosted nightly bands and dance since it opened. In 1924 Isham Jones's band played jazz, in the 1930s and into the 1950 Big Bands-Jazz play like: Artie Shaw, Ted Fio Rito, Lawrence Welk, Benny Goodman, Skinnay Ennis, Paul Whiteman, Billy May, Tex Beneke, Les Elgart, Hal McIntyre and Si Zentner. In the 1960s the ballroom had artists Nat King Cole Sonny and Cher, the New Christy Minstrels and The Four Freshmen. From 1924 to 1965 the Miss California Pageant took place at the Casino's Boardwalk. Many movies and TV shows have been shot on the Casino's Boardwalk: Sudden Impact, Mr. Peabody and the Mermaid, America Screams, and The Lost Boys.

Plunge Natatorium
Built in 1907 on the Santa Cruz Beach Boardwalk, the Plunge Natatorium was an indoor swimming pool that used heated Monterey Bay Pacific Ocean salt water. The main swimming pool was 144 feet by 64 feet and had a 40-foot slide. The two pools held 408,000 gallons. The pool was refilled and heated to 83 degrees each night. An added attraction was the Water Carnival.  The Water Carnival had entertainment like: Ruth Kahl, known as the human submarine, a world record holder for deep underwater swimming down to 303 feet; Dido Scettrini, Shirley Wightman and Harry Murray all human submarines, flying trapeze artists; fire divers; Stratosphere Plungers; water ballets; Duke Kahanamoku an Olympic swimmer and surfer; fire dives; Don "Bosco" Patterson log zip line rider, swimming team races and other exhibitions. Later called The Plunge or the Santa Cruz Swimming Pavilion. Natatorium opened in 1907 and closed in 1963. On the old site a miniature golf course was built. After the remodel, some structural features of the old pool were still visible on the outer edges of the mini-golf course. After the 1989 Loma Prieta Earthquake this mini-golf course was replaced with a new one, called in Neptune's Kingdom

Casa Del Rey
In 1910 Swanton had a large resort hotel built. Across from the new Casino architect George Applegarth designed and built the new 100,000 square feet 300 rooms hotel. Some of the original Cottage were kept. The hotel was built in the Spanish Colonial Revival architecture with some Pueblo Revival architecture. A triple-arched pedestrian bridge crossed the street and railroad tracks. The hotel was 335 feet by 135 feet, with a phone in each room and elevators. The hotel had Italian gardens and a grand lobby. Hotel has assess to its restaurant, tennis courts, and bandstand. To get to the hotel it had is own rail and streetcar stop. The streetcar could take guests to the hotel's private golf course, now Pogonip park.  The grand opening for the $500,000 (2019 money $12.25 million) resort was held on May 1, 1911. The Santa Cruz Seaside Company was found to run the resort in 1915. Visits by car increased when the Glenwood Highway (Ca17) was paved in 1921. With more guest in 1926, the Seaside Company built the Casa del Rey Apartments designed by architect William C. Hays. Casa del Rey Apartments were built in Spanish revival style and had some ocean-view luxury suites. On March 31, 1928, the Casa Del Rey Spanish Gardens had it grand opening, Vera McKenna Clayton wrote original music for the opening. The Spanish Gardens were built where some of the old cottages were taken down. Casa Del Rey Spanish Gardens had: trees, flower, bushes, playground and glass solarium. Spanish Gardens opened with a Spanish café, a French café and tea pavilion. Management of the hotel change in 1932, J. Vance, Gifford L Troyer, and W. C. Troyer, ran the hotel. The Casino 's Bay Room ball became a conference center and entertainment stage.

Naval Convalescent Hospital Santa Cruz
On 9 March 9, 1943 the US Navy leased the hotel as 500 bed Convalescent hospital for wound war troops, known as Naval Convalescent Hospital Santa Cruz and also Naval Special Hospital, Santa Cruz. The Pacific War having been fought for a little over a year had many Navy wounded. Frederick E Porter, a retired Medical Corps Captain, was put in charge of the new hospital. The large pool worked great in physical therapy. Over 18,000 service men received care at the hospital before it was closed on April 1, 1946. During the war the Army's 963rd Amphibious Brigade used the Plunge for water safety training. About 700 men from Fort Ord camped at De Laveaga Park and trained at the Plunge.

Post War
The hotel and apartments never returned to their glory after the war. The apartments were sold by Santa Cruz Seaside Company in 1944 to George Holland; sold again in 1964 to Dr. Allegrini and renamed the La Bahia Apartments and are still in use. In 1983 Santa Cruz Seaside Company bought back the apartments and used them as University of California, Santa Cruz student housing. In 1942 many of the cottages were taken down to made a parking lot. The pedestrian bridge was removed in 1952. In 1953 a restaurant workers strike reduced attendance. The great December 1955 flood did much damage and reduced attendance more. In 1955 it rained from December 6 to December 23, causing wide spread flooding. In 1956 more cottages (?) and the gardens were removed for more parking. In the 1970s the hotel was changed to a retirement home. The 1989 Loma Prieta earthquake did serious damage and the retirement home was taken down after 78 years of use. All the land was now a  Santa Cruz Beach Boardwalk parking lot. The only remains of the grand resort are two large palm trees that were near the grand pedestrian bridge. The Casino building of 1907 survives, after several renovations, as the Cocoanut Grove event center, while the Plunge building now houses the Neptune's Kingdom entertainment complex and retail shops.

 A panoramic view of the Boardwalk from the pier, with Boardwalk's Coconut Grove on the left.

See also
California during World War II

References

Naval Convalescent Hospital Santa Cruz
Casa del Rey Hotel
1911 establishments in California
History of Santa Cruz County, California
History of the Monterey Bay Area